is a Japanese manga anthology. It is published by Akita Shoten since March 1970.

Manga artists and series

Daijiro Morohoshi
Mudmen
Hideo Azuma
Chibi Mama-chan
Kakuto Family
Yadorigi-kun
Hideyuki Yonehara
Chocolate Blus
Hiroshi Takahashi
Crows
Worst
Keiji Nakazawa
Advance! Donganden
Genkotsu Iwata
Kenjiro Kawatsu
No Bra
Kentarō Yano
Hunter Killer Mina
Masami no Kimochi
Masaki Satou
Bokura Chōjō Club Desu
Mirai Ningen Go Go Go
Miki Tori
Tamanegi Parco
Tokimeki Brain
Mitsuteru Yokoyama
His Name Is 101
Morishige
Hanaukyo Maid Team
Nagisa Fujita
Do Chokkyuu Kareshi x Kanojo
Yū Minamoto
Samurai Harem: Asu no Yoichi
Shinigo Honda
Creature!

References

External links
  (Japanese)

1970 establishments in Japan
Akita Shoten magazines
Magazines established in 1970
Magazines published in Tokyo
Monthly manga magazines published in Japan
Shōnen manga magazines